Andrew Burke (born 1944 in Melbourne, Victoria) is a contemporary Australian poet.

Early in his working life, Burke pursued a career in advertising as a copywriter and creative director.

In the 1970s he had received prizes - the Thomas Wardle poetry prize of 1973, and 1977 the Tom Collins poetry prize.

He switched to academia as a literature and creative writing lecturer in middle age. He received a MA in writing from Edith Cowan University in 2002, and a PhD in writing in 2006.

He has lectured in Australia and China, and read his poetry to audiences of all ages in the United Kingdom, Singapore, China, and throughout Australia.

His poetry has been included in Western Australian and Australian anthologies.

Collections of his poems exist online  and his blog includes poetry.

Works
 1975 Let's face the music & dance
 1983 On the tip of my tongue Fremantle, W.A.:Fremantle Arts Centre Press (Shoreline poetry series number 6) 
 1992 Mother waits for father late Fremantle, W.A.: Fremantle Arts Centre Press, 
 (reprinted in 2010) by Picaro Press, Warners Bay, N.S.W.  
 1996 Pushing at silence Applecross, W.A.: Folio (Salt), 
 2001 Whispering Gallery Cottesloe, W.A.: Sunline Press, 
 2003 Knock on wood : and other poems Warners Bay, N.S.W. : Picara Press, Wagtail (series), 1444-8424; 18
 2009  Beyond City Limits International Centre for Landscape and Language, Edith Cowan University, Mt Lawley, W.A.  
 2011  Blue Rose Etext Press  also found at Smashwords – 
 2011  Qwerty : take my word for it Kalgoorlie, W.A. :Mulla Mulla Press 
 2012  Shikibu Shuffle with Phil Hall – see http://abovegroundpress.blogspot.com.au/2012/03/new-from-aboveground-press-shikibu.html
 2012  Undercover of Lightness North Hobart, Tas.: Walleah Press   –
 2014  One Hour Seeds Another North Hobart, Tas.: Walleah Press
 2017   The Line is Busy

Notes

External links
 
 Interview with Andrew Burke on The Australian Poetry Podcast  

1944 births
Living people
Poets from Melbourne
Writers from Western Australia
21st-century Australian poets
20th-century Australian poets